Conder is one of three suburbs in the Lanyon Valley in Canberra, Australia. It lies in the district of Tuggeranong. The three suburbs are presently (as of 2011) the southernmost suburbs of the city, although the small settlement of Tharwa exists only a short distance further south.

Named after artist Charles Conder, the suburb of Conder extends from the slopes of Tuggeranong Hill to the valley floor. Conder is home to the valley's main services including the Lanyon Market Place, Lanyon High School and one of the four Vikings clubs in Canberra. Also included in the suburb are St Clare of Assisi Primary School, Charles Conder Primary School, a youth centre, child care centre and a family services centre.

Just like the name of the suburb, the streets of Conder are named after artists, including members of the Heidelberg School and places associated with that school. Among those recognised are Russell Drysdale and Tom Roberts.

Major developments in Conder including "Eastern Valley Rise" and "The Landscape" have seen the Lanyon Valley's population grow rapidly. Conder has come out on top with the highest median house price growth year-on-year out of all Canberra suburbs

Geology 

Quaternary Alluvium covers the whole suburb.  Underneath the alluvium and on the surrounding hills are Deakin Volcanics erupted during the Silurian age at 414 Mya. These include ignimbrite and tuff

Gallery

Footnotes

References 
Place names search, Geoscience Australia

Suburbs of Canberra